Taeko Kubo (born 10 February 1949) is a Japanese diver. She competed in the women's 3 metre springboard event at the 1972 Summer Olympics.

References

1949 births
Living people
Japanese female divers
Olympic divers of Japan
Divers at the 1972 Summer Olympics
Place of birth missing (living people)
20th-century Japanese women